The Audenis E.P.2, (sometimes known as the Audenis-Jacob E.P.2}, including Audenis' collaborator Jean Jacob), was a two-seat training biplane, designed and built in France during 1916. Powered by an  Le Rhône 9C 9-cylinder rotary engine, the E.P.2 had equal span single bay biplane wings and a fuselage in two parts, the forward part being fabric covered and the aft portion being of monocoque construction. The undercarriage was of conventional tailskid configuration with the duralumin mainwheel axle attached to the fuselage by V-struts. Dual controls were provided in the single open cockpit, with the student in the front seat and the instructor behind. Development of the E.P.2 did not continue after initial flight trials.

Specifications (E.P.2)

References

Biplanes
Aircraft first flown in 1916
Rotary-engined aircraft
Single-engined tractor aircraft